Enzo Eduardo Monteiro de Castro Becerra (born 27 May 2004) is a Bolivian professional footballer who plays as a forward for Santos.

Club career
Born in Santa Cruz de la Sierra, Bolivia to former Brazilian footballer Edu Monteiro, who was playing in the country at the time, Monteiro started his career with a local football school named Toreto Garcia at the age of four. At the age of eleven, he joined professional side Blooming, but only two years later he joined Proyecto Bolivia 2022, a project created to encourage the development of young Bolivian footballers.

In late 2018, he moved to Brazil, signing with Santos at the same time as Proyecto Bolivia 2022 teammate Miguel Terceros. Shortly after, the pair were joined by Leonardo Zabala, who Monteiro has known since he was nine, as their parents played football together in Bolivia. Monteiro signed his first professional contract with Santos in June 2022, signing a three-year deal with the option for two additional years.

International career
Monteiro represented Bolivia at the 2019 South American U-15 Championship, making five appearances.

References

2004 births
Living people
Sportspeople from Santa Cruz de la Sierra
Bolivian people of Brazilian descent
Brazilian footballers
Bolivian footballers
Bolivia youth international footballers
Association football forwards
Club Blooming players
Santos FC players